The Governors’ Climate and Forests Task Force (GCF Task Force) is a sub-national collaboration between 38 states and provinces  from Brazil, Colombia, Ecuador, Indonesia, Ivory Coast, Mexico, Nigeria, Peru, Spain, and the United States. The Task Force is designed to support jurisdictional approaches to low emissions rural development and reduced emissions from deforestation and land use (REDD+), specifically through performance-based payment schemes and national or state-based greenhouse gas (GHG) compliance regimes.

The Task Force was initiated by former California Governor Arnold Schwarzenegger on November 18, 2008 at the Governors’ Climate Change Summit in Los Angeles, California. At this summit the U.S. states of California, Illinois, and Wisconsin, the Brazilian states of Amapá, Amazonas, Mato Grosso, and Pará, and the Indonesian provinces of Aceh and Papua signed memoranda of understanding (MOUs) supporting cooperation on a number of issues related to climate policy, financing, technological cooperation, and research. These MOUs also called for the creation of a Joint Action Plan to provide a framework for implementing the MOUs in the forest section. The GCF Task Force held its first international meeting in 2009 in Belem, Brazil, where it approved its Joint Action Plan.

Current member states

See also

 Deforestation and climate change
 Deforestation by region
 Emissions trading
 Tree credits
 Tree planting
 Reducing emissions from deforestation and forest degradation

Notes

References

External links
GCF Task Force Website

2008 in the environment
Environmental treaties